Scandium nitride (ScN) is a binary III-V indirect bandgap semiconductor. It is composed of the scandium cation and the nitride anion. It forms crystals that can be grown on tungsten foil through sublimation and recondensation. It has a rock-salt crystal structure with lattice constant of 0.451 nanometer,  an indirect bandgap of 0.9 eV and direct bandgap of 2 to 2.4 eV. These crystals can be synthesized by dissolving nitrogen gas with indium-scandium melts, magnetron sputtering, MBE, HVPE and other deposition methods. Scandium Nitride is also an effective gate for semiconductors on a silicon dioxide (SiO2) or hafnium dioxide (HfO2) substrate.

References

Scandium compounds
Nitrides
Rock salt crystal structure